Stangeia distantia is a moth of the family Pterophoridae that is found on the Marquesas Archipelago.

The antenna are black, spotted with white and the head is olive buff. The thorax is olive buff, although buff posteriorly. The forewing ground colour is olive buff. The hindwings are fuscous.

References

Oxyptilini
Moths described in 1986
Moths of Oceania